The False 'Opihi or False limpet otherwise known as Siphonaria normalis is an air breathing sea snail that shares its appearance with true limpets. 'Opihi means limpet in Hawaiian. They are part of the Order of Siphonariidae which are known as false limpets. They live in the mid to upper rocky intertidal zone along the coastlines and can be found throughout the Indo-Pacific regions.

Description 
These False limpets have a ribbed shell with a brown and white coloration. They can reach a maximum length of 20mm, but it is usually less than that size in Hawaii.

Reproduction 
They lay egg masses, in a spiral formation. When the eggs hatch, the Siphonaria normalis are then in the juvenile stage of their life.

Ecology 
Siphonaria normalis or False 'Opihi are grazers that generally consume algae along the rocky intertidal zones. The variety of algae consumed consists of lichens, cyanobacteria, diatoms, microalgae, and foliose macroalgae. As our climate continues to get warmer it causes thermal stress and mortality among the Siphonaria normalis.

Habitat and distribution 
Siphonaria normalis has a wide range in distribution throughout the Indo-Pacific. It lives in the rocky intertidal zones along the coastline of these regions. They do not live under the water, but need to be in areas that are wet constantly from the ocean.

Cultural significance 
The False 'Opihi was found to occasionally be harvested and consumed by the ancient Hawaiians.

References
Johnson, Michaela THERMAL TOLERANCE OF SIPHONARIA NORMALIS EMBRYOS ON OʻAHU, HAWAIʻI 

Cox, T.E.; Smith, C.M. Thermal ecology on an exposed algal reef: infrared imagery a rapid tool to survey temperature at local spatial scales

Dayrat, Benoit; Goulding, Tricia C.; White, Tracy R. Diversity of Indo-West Pacific Siphonaria (Mollusca: Gastropoda) 

Cox, Traci Erin; Philippoff, Joanna; Baumgartner, Erin; Zabin, Chela J.; Smith, Celia M. Spatial and Temporal Variation in Rocky Intertidal Communities along the Main Hawaiian Islands

Gould, A. Siphonaria normalis 

McCormack, Gerald Siphonaria normalis Common False-limpet

Field, Julie S.; Lipphardt, Jacqueline N.; Kirch, Patrick V.  Trends in Marine Foraging in Precontact and Historic Leeward Kohala, Hawai‘i Island

Siphonariidae
Gastropods described in 1846